
Gmina Bogdaniec is a rural gmina (administrative district) in Gorzów County, Lubusz Voivodeship, in western Poland.

Villages
Gmina Bogdaniec contains the villages and settlements of Bogdaniec, Chwałowice, Gostkowice, Jasiniec, Jenin, Jeninek, Jeniniec, Jeże, Jeżyki, Krzyszczyna, Krzyszczynka, Kwiatkowice, Lubczyno, Łupowo, Motylewo, Podjenin, Racław, Roszkowice, Stanowice, Wieprzyce Dolne and Włostów.

Neighbouring gminas
Gmina Bogdaniec is bordered by the city of Gorzów Wielkopolski and by the gminas of Deszczno, Krzeszyce, Lubiszyn and Witnica.

Twin towns – sister cities

Gmina Bogdaniec is twinned with:
 Petershagen-Eggersdorf, Germany

References

Bogdaniec
Gorzów County